Jacques Adam (1663 – 12 November 1735) was a French translator.

Biography
Adam was born at Vendôme, where he was a gifted pupil of the Oratory of Saint Philip Neri, he was sent to Paris where, at the age of 14, he assisted Claude Fleury in his research and participated in the production of his classic Histoire ecclésiastique.  He became the tutor of the Prince of Conti, and then of his son, who helped him gain membership in the Académie française in 1723.

A scholar of Greek and Hebrew, he translated Athenaeus and also published his works in Greek.  In 1712, he also translated Raimondo Montecuccoli's Memorie della guerra from the Italian, helping its author to become better known in Europe.  He died in Paris.

D'Alembert said of Jacques Adam:

External links 
 Académie française

References 

1663 births
1735 deaths
People from Vendôme
Alumni of Oratorian schools
Translators to French
Translators from Greek
Translators from Hebrew
Translators from Italian
French classical scholars
Members of the Académie Française